Hugo Noé Pino is a Honduran economist, diplomat and politician from Liberty and Refoundation. He served as President of the Central Bank of Honduras from 1994 to 1997, Permanent Representative of Honduras to the United Nations from 1998 to 1999, and as Minister of Finance in 2006. Pino has been First Vice President of the National Congress of Honduras since 25 January 2022.

References 

Living people
Year of birth missing (living people)
Permanent Representatives of Honduras to the United Nations

Deputies of the National Congress of Honduras
Legislative deputy speakers
21st-century Honduran politicians
Liberty and Refoundation politicians
Honduran bankers
Honduran economists
Finance Ministers of Honduras